Shadbolt is a surname. Notable people with the name include:
Abbie Shadbolt ( early 1900s), New Zealand rugby league player
Blunden Shadbolt (1879–1949),  British architect 
Caitlyn Shadbolt (born 1996), Australian singer/songwriter 
Cecil Shadbolt (1859-1892), British photographer, and a pioneer of aerial photography from hot air balloons; son of George
Doris Shadbolt (1918–2003), Canadian art curator and writer
Ernest Shadbolt (1851-1936), British engineer and proponent of public open space
George Shadbolt  (1817–1901), British writer, photographer and botanist; father of Cecil
Jack Shadbolt (1909–1998), Canadian painter
Joe Shadbolt (1874–1967), English Footballer
John Shadbolt (born ?), Canadian politician
Ken Shadbolt (1921–2012), Australian rules footballer
Kylie Shadbolt (born 1972), Australian artistic gymnast
Loomis Shadbolt, (1883–1963), American politician
Maurice Shadbolt (1932–2004), New Zealand writer and playwright
Sir Nigel Shadbolt (born 1956), British Artificial Intelligence expert
René Shadbolt (1903–1977), New Zealand military nurse and hospital matron
Tim Shadbolt (born 1947), New Zealand politician

Fictional 

Norman Shadbolt, character in Home and Away

See also
Mount Shadbolt

de:Shadbolt
it:Shadbolt